Slovakia is a landlocked Central European country with mountainous regions in the north and flat terrain in the south. During much of the Holocene, Slovakia was much more forested than today. Decline of the forest occurred in as consequence of the Valachian colonization and the development of mining in the territory.

Statistics 
Land use:

agricultural land: 40.1%

arable land: 28.9%; permanent crops: 0.4%; permanent pasture: 10.8%

forest: 40.2%

other: 19.7% (2011 est.)

Natural resources:

Lignite, small amounts of iron ore, copper and manganese ore; salt; arable land

Natural Hazards:

Flooding

Environment-international agreements:

Party to: Air Pollution, Air Pollution-Nitrogen Oxides, Air Pollution-Persistent Organic Pollutants, Air Pollution-Sulfur 85, Air Pollution-Sulfur 94, Air Pollution-Volatile Organic Compounds, Antarctic Treaty, Biodiversity, Climate Change, Climate Change-Kyoto Protocol, Desertification, Endangered Species, Environmental Modification, Hazardous Wastes, Law of the Sea, Ozone Layer Protection, Ship Pollution, Wetlands, Whaling.

Signed, but not ratified: none of the selected agreements

Area

Slovakia lies between 49°36'48" and 47°44'21" northern latitude and 16°50'56" and 22°33'53" eastern longitude.

The northernmost point is near Beskydok, a mountain on the border with Poland near the village of Oravská Polhora in the Beskids. The southernmost point is near the village of Patince on the Danube on the border with Hungary. The westernmost point is on the Morava River near Záhorská Ves on the Austrian border. The easternmost point is close to the summit of Kremenec, a mountain near the village of Nová Sedlica at the meeting point of Slovak, Polish, and Ukrainian borders.

The remaining 8% is mostly covered with human structures and infrastructure, and partly with rocky mountain ridges and other unimproved land.

The village of Veľké Slemence (Ukrainian: Mali Slementsi/Малі Селменці, Hungarian: Szelmenc) is an anomaly, as it is a village with a majority of Hungarians, but it is split between Slovakia and Ukraine.

National parks 

There are 9 national parks in Slovakia, covering 6.5% of the Slovak land surface.

Geographical features

Tatra mountains 

The Tatra Mountains, with 29 peaks higher than  AMSL, are the highest mountain range in the Carpathian Mountains. They are divided into several parts.

The Tatra mountain range is represented as one of the three hills on the coat of arms of Slovakia.

Caves 

Slovakia has hundreds of caves and caverns under its mountains, of which 30 are open to the public. Most of the caves have stalagmites rising from the ground and stalactites hanging from above. There are currently five Slovak caves under UNESCO's World Heritage Site status. They are Dobšiná Ice Cave, Domica, Gombasek Cave, Jasovská Cave and Ochtinská Aragonite Cave. Other caves open to the public include Belianska Cave, Demänovská Cave of Liberty, Demänovská Ice Cave or Bystrianska Cave.

Rivers 

Most of the rivers arise in the Slovak mountains. Some only pass through Slovakia, while others make a natural border with surrounding countries (more than ). For example, the Dunajec to the north, the Danube to the south or the Morava to the West.

The longest river in Slovakia is the Váh, the shortest is the Čierna voda. Other important and large rivers are the Myjava, the Nitra, the Orava, the Hron, the Hornád, the Slaná, the Ipeľ (forming the border with Hungary), the Bodrog, the Laborec, the Latorica and the Ondava.

The biggest volume of discharge in Slovak rivers is during spring, when the snow melts from the mountains. The only exception is the Danube, whose discharge is the greatest during summer when the snow melts in the Alps. The Danube is the largest river that flows through Slovakia.

Climate 

The Slovak climate lies between the temperate and continental climate zones with relatively warm summers and cold, cloudy and humid winters. Temperature extremes are between  although temperatures below  are rare. The weather differs from the mountainous north to the plains in the south.

During night it may be freezing, but usually not below .

In Slovakia, there are four seasons, each season (spring, summer, autumn and winter) lasts three months. The dry continental air brings in the summer heat and winter frosts. In contrast, oceanic air brings rainfalls and reduces summer temperatures. In the lowlands and valleys, there is often fog, especially in winter.

In Slovakia, the weather and climate in the spring are very unstable.

Summer starts on 22 June and is usually characterised by hot weather with daily temperatures exceeding . Showers or thunderstorms may occur because of the summer monsoon called Medardova kvapka (Medard drop - 40 days of rain).

Autumn in Slovakia starts on 23 September and is mostly characterised by wet weather and wind, although the first weeks can be very warm and sunny. Late September and early October is a dry and sunny time of year (so-called Indian summer).

In December and January, it is usually snowing, these are the coldest months of the year. At lower altitudes, snow does not stay the whole winter, it changes into the thaw and frost.

Examples

Biodiversity 

Slovakia signed the Rio Convention on Biological Diversity on 19 May 1993, and became a party to the convention on 25 August 1994. It has subsequently produced a National Biodiversity Strategy and Action Plan, which was received by the convention on 2 November 1998.

The biodiversity of Slovakia comprises animals (such as annelids, arthropods, molluscs, nematodes and vertebrates), fungi (Ascomycota, Basidiomycota, Chytridiomycota, Glomeromycota and Zygomycota), micro-organisms (including Mycetozoa), and plants. The geographical position of Slovakia determines the richness of the diversity of fauna and flora. More than 11,000 plant species have been described throughout its territory, nearly 29,000 animal species and over 1,000 species of protozoa. Endemic biodiversity is also common.

Slovakia is located in the biome of temperate broadleaf and mixed forests and terrestrial ecoregions of Pannonian mixed forests and Carpathian montane conifer forests. As the altitude changes, the vegetation associations and animal communities are forming height levels (oak, beech, spruce, scrub pine, alpine meadows and subsoil). Forests cover 44% of the territory of Slovakia. The country had a 2019 Forest Landscape Integrity Index mean score of 4.34/10, ranking it 129th globally out of 172 countries. In terms of forest stands, 60% are broadleaf trees and 40% are coniferous trees. The occurrence of animal species is strongly connected to the appropriate types of plant associations and biotopes.

Over 4,000 species of fungi have been recorded from Slovakia. Of these, nearly 1,500 are lichen-forming species. Some of these fungi are undoubtedly endemic, but not enough is known to say how many. Of the lichen-forming species, about 40% have been classified as threatened in some way. About 7% are apparently extinct, 9% endangered, 17% vulnerable, and 7% rare. The conservation status of non-lichen-forming fungi in Slovakia is not well documented, but there is a red list for its larger fungi.

Lakes
 

Lakes of Slovakia
Baňur

References